The Catumbela Estuary is an estuary in Benguela Province of Angola. It has the coastal city of Lobito to the north.

References

Geography of Angola